Brooklyn Amity School (also known as Amity) is a  UPK-12 private school that was founded in 1999. As of 2016, 256 students were enrolled.

Academic Curriculum 
AP Courses: AP Language, AP World History,
AP US History, AP Government, AP Calculus, AP
Biology*, AP Art Studio, AP Psychology
English: English I, II, III, IV, English I,II, III Honors,
Creative Writing, Public Speaking, Reading
Comprehension, American Literature
ESL: ESL Foundations, Grammar, Reading, Writing,
Speaking, Listening, Vocabulary, American Ethics
and Culture, Accelerated Reading
Mathematics: Algebra I, Algebra II, Algebra II
Honors*, Integrated Algebra (ESL), Geometry,
Geometry Honors*, Pre- Calculus, SAT Math
Science: Biology, Biology Honors. Chemistry,
Chemistry Honors*, Physics, Scientific Research and
Design, Introduction to Biology (ESL)
Social Studies: World History, US History, Civics,
Psychology*, Economics, Integrated World History
(ESL)
Foreign Languages: Spanish**, Turkish**,
Russian**

Other
The school has competed in the regional Science Olympiad competition, getting first place in 2008 and 2007 and 4th in 2006. The school also took part in the 2008 Future City Competition.

References

External links
 Brooklyn Amity School Official Website

Middle Eastern-American culture in New York City
Private elementary schools in Brooklyn
Private middle schools in Brooklyn
Private high schools in Brooklyn
Turkish-American culture in New York (state)
Sheepshead Bay, Brooklyn